The W.A.R. F4U Corsair is a 50% scale homebuilt replica of the Chance-Vought F4U Corsair Second World War carrier fighter.

Design and development
The aircraft is a single place, single engine gull-wing design with retractable conventional landing gear. The F4U was the second completed aircraft in the W.A.R. series, with the first example displayed at the EAA airshow in 1975. The aircraft featured folding wings.

Operational history
A WAR F4U built by Fred Bauer Jr. was featured as the cover plane on the January 1980 Popular Mechanics. The plane was built from plans that cost $145.

Variants
Some versions were built using  Lycoming O-235 and  HCI radial engines. One example was built using a Rotec R2800 radial engine.

Specifications (W.A.R. F4U Corsair)

Notes

References

Taylor, John W. R. Jane's All The World's Aircraft 1988–89. Coulsdon, UK:Jane's Defence Data, 1988. .

External links

 War Aircraft Replicas International Inc 
 W.A.R. Aircraft Replicas International

Homebuilt aircraft
F4U
Single-engined tractor aircraft
Inverted gull-wing aircraft
Low-wing aircraft
1970s United States sport aircraft
Replica aircraft